Abdulaziz Alshatti (born 30 October 1990) is a Kuwaiti fencer who competed in the Épée Individual the 2016 Summer Olympics. He participated within the Independent Olympic Athletes team.

References

External links
 
 

1990 births
Living people
Kuwaiti male épée fencers
Olympic fencers of Kuwait
Fencers at the 2016 Summer Olympics
Olympic fencers as Independent Olympic Participants
Fencers at the 2018 Asian Games
Asian Games competitors for Kuwait